Tomaszewski is a Polish masculine surname, which may be transliterated from Cyrillic languages as Tomashevsky or Tomashevskiy. Its feminine counterpart is Tomaszewska or Tomashevskaya. It may refer to:
 Andrzej Tomaszewski (1934–2010), Polish historian of art and culture, architect
 Bohdan Tomaszewski (1921–2015), Polish sport journalist
 Boris Tomashevsky (1890–1957), Russian literary scholar and historian
 David Tomaszewski (born 1984), French music video director
 Dawid Tomaszewski (born 1980), Polish art fashion designer
 Evgeny Tomashevsky (born 1987), Russian chess grandmaster
 Henryk Tomaszewski (1914–2005), Polish poster artist
 Henryk Tomaszewski (1919–2001), Polish mime artist and theatre director
 Irene Tomaszewski (born 1940), Polish-Canadian writer
 Jan Tomaszewski (born 1948), Polish footballer
 Janusz Tomaszewski (born 1956), Polish politician
 Jerzy Tomaszewski (1930–2014), Polish historian
 Jerzy Tomaszewski (born 1924), Polish photographer
 Marek Tomaszewski (born 1943), Polish pianist
 Marian Tomaszewski (born 1922), Polish military officer and scout leader
 Michał Tomaszewski (born 1982), Polish ice dancer 
 Piotr Tomaszewski (born 1974), Polish guitarist
 Stanisław Miedza-Tomaszewski (1913–2000), Polish war artist and underground fighter
 Tadeusz Tomaszewski (born 1959), Polish politician
 Tadeusz Tomaszewski (1881–1950), Polish politician
 Tomasz Tomaszewski, Polish violinist
 Waldemar Tomaszewski (born 1965), Polish politician

Polish-language surnames